John W. Bouchelle (died May 29, 1937) was an American politician and farmer from Maryland. He served as a member of the Maryland House of Delegates, representing Cecil County, from 1916 to 1917 and 1927 to 1930.

Early life
John W. Bouchelle was born to Augustus J. Bouchelle, son of John W. Bouchelle. Bouchelle studied law, but did not practice.

Career
Buchelle worked as a farmer. Bouchelle was a Democrat. Bouchelle served as a member of the Maryland House of Delegates, representing Cecil County, from 1916 to 1917 and 1927 to 1930.

Personal life
Bouchelle did not marry. Bouchelle died on May 29, 1937, at a sanitorium near Salisbury, Maryland. He was buried at Bethel Cemetery in Chesapeake City.

References

Year of birth missing
1937 deaths
Democratic Party members of the Maryland House of Delegates
20th-century American politicians